Rosa Amanda Sillanpää (18 June 1888, Hauho – 6 October 1929) was a Finnish trade union activist and politician. She was a Member of the Parliament of Finland from 1922 to 1923, representing the Socialist Workers' Party of Finland (SSTP). She was imprisoned on sedition charges from 1923 to 1926 and worked as a trade union official from 1926 to 1929.

References

1888 births
1929 deaths
People from Hämeenlinna
People from Häme Province (Grand Duchy of Finland)
Socialist Workers Party of Finland politicians
Members of the Parliament of Finland (1922–24)
Women members of the Parliament of Finland
20th-century Finnish women politicians
Prisoners and detainees of Finland